FK Vidar is an association football club from Stavanger, Norway. They currently play in the 3. divisjon, the fourth highest level in the Norwegian football league system.

Club history
The club was founded on 18 April 1906. FK Vidar played their first match against Stavanger IF on 15 August 1906. They lost 1–0. They became members of the Norwegian Football Association in 1909, and won their first league title in 1912 when the junior team became district champions of Rogaland.

The club has spent most of its time between the third and fourth tiers in Norway and from 1952 to 1962 they found themselves languishing in the regional leagues. It was not until the 1980s that Vidar began to develop into one of the better teams in Stavanger. They established themselves as one of the top teams at the Norwegian second tier (named 2. divisjon at that time, now known as 1. divisjon), only just failing to achieve promotion in 1984 and 1986 and finishing among the top four a total of five times. They competed directly against their city rivals Viking FK in 1987 and 1988, finishing ahead of them in 1987.

1989 saw the beginning of the decline. FK Vidar were relegated to the third tier, and in 2004 they were relegated again to the fourth tier (Third Division) where they remained for many years. In 2009 Vidar won the play-offs to win re-promotion to the 2010 Norwegian Second Division.

Their ground is Lassa Idrettspark which has a capacity of around 5,000 spectators. The club's colours are red, the home kit is red with white stripes and the away kit is black with white stripes.

Since 2013, the team have developed a strong following of global fans. Sales of the football shirts, with the new Fenrir logo, rocketed. The rise in sales was due to the TV personality Tim Lovejoy tweeting about the team on Twitter. Fans 'watch' matches by following the Twitter feed each game. Some fans have even travelled to Stavanger to watch Vidar play at the Lassa.

Player records
Topscorer, Jan Fjetland – 289 goals
Appearance record, Egil Klinkenberg – 510 games (1966–91)

Recent history 
{|class="wikitable"
|-bgcolor="#efefef"
! Season
!
! Pos.
! Pl.
! W
! D
! L
! GS
! GA
! P
!Cup
!Notes
|-
|2003
|2. divisjon
|align=right |10
|align=right|26||align=right|10||align=right|1||align=right|15
|align=right|28||align=right|71||align=right|31
||First round
|
|-
|2004
|2. divisjon
|align=right bgcolor="#FFCCCC"| 12
|align=right|26||align=right|7||align=right|6||align=right|13
|align=right|35||align=right|51||align=right|27
||First round
|Relegated to the 3. divisjon
|-
|2005
|3. divisjon
|align=right|5
|align=right|22||align=right|9||align=right|5||align=right|8
|align=right|46||align=right|39||align=right|32
||First round
|
|-
|2006
|3. divisjon
|align=right |1
|align=right|22||align=right|16||align=right|1||align=right|5
|align=right|75||align=right|30||align=right|49
||First qualifying round
|Lost playoffs for promotion
|-
|2007
|3. divisjon
|align=right |2
|align=right|26||align=right|18||align=right|3||align=right|5
|align=right|70||align=right|28||align=right|57
||Second qualifying round
|
|-
|2008
|3. divisjon
|align=right |2
|align=right|26||align=right|20||align=right|4||align=right|2
|align=right|89||align=right|27||align=right|64
||First round
|
|-
|2009
|3. divisjon
|align=right bgcolor=#DDFFDD| 1
|align=right|26||align=right|22||align=right|3||align=right|1
|align=right|92||align=right|14||align=right|69
||Second round
|Promoted to the 2. divisjon
|-
|2010
|2. divisjon
|align=right|8
|align=right|26||align=right|10||align=right|7||align=right|9
|align=right|47||align=right|40||align=right|37
||First round
|
|-
|2011
|2. divisjon
|align=right|5
|align=right|26||align=right|11||align=right|4||align=right|11
|align=right|41||align=right|48||align=right|37
||Second round
|
|-
|2012
|2. divisjon
|align=right|5
|align=right|26||align=right|10||align=right|8||align=right|8
|align=right|42||align=right|42||align=right|38
||Second round
|
|-
|2013
|2. divisjon
|align=right|11
|align=right|26||align=right|10||align=right|3||align=right|13
|align=right|49||align=right|66||align=right|33
||Second round
|
|-
|2014
|2. divisjon
|align=right|4
|align=right|26||align=right|11||align=right|7||align=right|8
|align=right|48||align=right|40||align=right|40
||Second round
|
|-
|2015
|2. divisjon
|align=right|4
|align=right|26||align=right|10||align=right|10||align=right|6
|align=right|60||align=right|44||align=right|40
||First round
|
|-
|2016
|2. divisjon
|align=right|7
|align=right|26||align=right|12||align=right|3||align=right|11
|align=right|55||align=right|60||align=right|39
||Fourth round
|
|-
|2017
|2. divisjon
|align=right|4
|align=right|26||align=right|13||align=right|3||align=right|10
|align=right|56||align=right|49||align=right|42
||First round
|
|-
|2018 
|2. divisjon
|align=right|9
|align=right|26||align=right|10||align=right|3||align=right|13
|align=right|41||align=right|51||align=right|33
||Second round
|
|-
|2019 
|2. divisjon
|align=right bgcolor="#FFCCCC"| 12
|align=right|26||align=right|5||align=right|6||align=right|15
|align=right|32||align=right|51||align=right|21
||First round
|Relegated to the 3. divisjon
|-
|2020
|colspan="11"|Season cancelled
|-
|2021
|3. divisjon
|align=right |8
|align=right|13||align=right|5||align=right|2||align=right|6
|align=right|21||align=right|20||align=right|17
|Second round
|
|-
|2022
|3. divisjon
|align=right |5
|align=right|26||align=right|12||align=right|6||align=right|8
|align=right|54||align=right|42||align=right|42
|Second round
|
|}
Source:

References

External links
Official site

 
Football clubs in Norway
Sport in Stavanger
Association football clubs established in 1906
1906 establishments in Norway